The Adriatic Basketball Association All-Star Game was a basketball event which was organised by the ABA League, a regional competition featuring clubs from former Yugoslavia and countries such as (Bosnia and Herzegovina, Croatia, Montenegro, North Macedonia, Serbia and Slovenia). The All-Star Game was played for two seasons, in 2006-07 and 2007-08 and featured a game between East and West, a slam-dunk and a three-point shoot contest.

List of games
Bold: Team that won the game.

Slam-Dunk champions

Three-point shoot contest

2006 All-Star Game

Team rosters

Report
December 27, 2006, Tivoli Hall, Ljubljana, Slovenia: West - East 134-118 (Quarters: 40-33,77-62, 107-91) 
WEST (Dražen Anzulović, Dario Gjergja): Davor Kus 15, Teemu Rannikko 7, Manuchar Markoishvili 15, Marko Milić 10, Todor Gećevski 8 - Ante Tomić 2, Dwayne Broyles 12, Smiljan Pavić 8, Robert Troha 6, Levour Warren 13, Emir Preldžić 7, Miloš Paravinja 2, Carl English 29. 
EAST (Vlada Vukoičić, Goran Radonjić): Saša Vasiljević 4, Goran Jeretin 5, Milan Gurović 15, Zoran Erceg 8, Bojan Popović 17 - Edin Bavčić 4, Milenko Tepić 11, Ivan Opačak 12, Nebojša Joksimović 13, Predrag Šuput 12, Nikola Peković 12, Aleksandar Rašić 5.

2007 All-Star Game

Team rosters

Report
December 12, 2007, Tivoli Hall, Ljubljana, Slovenia: East - West 136-113 (Quarters: 26-33, 57-59, 94-94) 
EAST (Duško Vujošević, Stevan Karadžić: Nikola Peković 26, Omar Cook, Tadija Dragičević 22, Milenko Tepić, Nebojša Joksimović, Milton Palacio, Vladimir Golubović, Siniša Štemberger, Vladan Vukosavljević 18, Goran Jagodnik, Vladimir Micov, Nemanja Gordić.
WEST (Aleksandar Petrović, Memi Bečirović): Marko Milić, Goran Dragić, Jakov Vladović, Jasmin Hukić, Todor Gečevski, Damjan Rudež 13, Ante Tomić, Corey Brewer 22, Andrija Stipanović, Jure Lalić, Damjan Rudež, Robert Troha 17, Lukša Andrić.

Players with most appearances

References

Basketball all-star games
ABA League
 Basketball in Yugoslavia